Selepet (Selepe) is a Papuan language spoken in Selepet Rural LLG, Morobe Province, Papua New Guinea.

Evolution

Below are some reflexes of proto-Trans-New Guinea proposed by Pawley (2012):

References

Languages of Morobe Province
Huon languages